Anthony Orange, previously named A. J. Jefferson (born April 4, 1988), is a Canadian football cornerback who is currently a free agent. He played college football at Fresno State. He was signed as an undrafted free agent by the Arizona Cardinals in 2010.

Early life and college career
Orange was born and raised in Bakersfield, California and graduated from West High School of Bakersfield in 2006. He began playing football at an early age but didn't play his junior year of high school. He played wide receiver and defensive back and earned first-team all-area selection as defensive back. Orange was a high school teammate of Ryan Mathews.

Orange then attended California State University, Fresno. From 2006 to 2009, He played four seasons on the Fresno State Bulldogs football team.

Professional career

Pre-draft
Orange was invited to the 2010 Scouting Combine and was predicted as a 4th to 5th round draft pick.

Arizona Cardinals
On April 27, 2010, the Arizona Cardinals signed 10 players, one of whom was the undrafted Orange.

Minnesota Vikings

On August 31, 2012, the Minnesota Vikings traded for Orange with the Cardinals for an undisclosed number of draft picks. This trade was later finalized with Arizona receiving one 6th round pick in the 2013 NFL Draft (Tennessee's by way of Minnesota) in return for Orange and Arizona's 7th Round pick in 2013.

Seattle Seahawks
Orange signed with the Seattle Seahawks on May 2, 2014. The Seahawks placed him on injured reserve on August 26, 2014.

Toronto Argonauts
Orange signed with the Toronto Argonauts of the Canadian Football League (CFL) on May 26, 2015. In two seasons with the Argos he played in 30 games and accumulated 91 defensive tackles, 6 interceptions, 5 special teams tackles and 2 touchdowns. 1 being a punt return against the Winnipeg Blue Bombers. Following the 2016 season he was not re-signed by the Argonauts, rendering him a free-agent.

Ottawa Redblacks
On February 14, 2017, the first day of CFL free agency, Orange signed with the Ottawa Redblacks (CFL). He was released by the club only 3 games into the 2017 season.

Saskatchewan Roughriders 
Orange signed with the Saskatchewan Roughriders (CFL) on July 18, 2017. He was released without playing a game on September 11, 2017.

Edmonton Eskimos 
Following multiple injuries in their defensive secondary, the Edmonton Eskimos signed Orange on September 13, 2017.

BC Lions 
Orange signed with the BC Lions on February 13, 2018, to a one-year contract. After a rough start to the season, including a 3–6 record and Orange committing a poorly timed penalty contributing to a loss, Orange stepped up his play, recording a career high in tackles, as well as interceptions with 5. The Lions finished the year by going 6–3, making the playoffs, and Orange was given both divisional and league All-Star recognition.

Edmonton Eskimos (II) 
Upon reaching free agency, Orange returned to Edmonton for the 2019 season, one of numerous marquee free agents to sign in Edmonton. He was released on February 1, 2020.

NFL statistics

Domestic Violence
In November 2013, Orange was arrested for felony domestic assault by strangulation. Police were called to his home early in the morning after Orange reportedly strangled his girlfriend and subsequently threw her on the floor while yelling that she had ignored his text messages. Orange pleaded guilty to misdemeanor domestic assault and was sentenced to 90 days in jail, reduced to 3 days time served. Orange was released by the Minnesota Vikings on the day of his arrest but was signed by the Seattle Seahawks in May 2014 following his guilty plea.

References

External links

Fresno State Bulldogs bio 
Minnesota Vikings bio 
Arizona Cardinals bio

1988 births
Living people
American football cornerbacks
Canadian football defensive backs
African-American players of American football
African-American players of Canadian football
Fresno State Bulldogs football players
Arizona Cardinals players
Minnesota Vikings players
Seattle Seahawks players
Toronto Argonauts players
Ottawa Redblacks players
Saskatchewan Roughriders players
Edmonton Elks players
BC Lions players
Players of American football from Bakersfield, California
21st-century African-American sportspeople
20th-century African-American people